The Old City Hall, now the Fairbanks Distilling Company, is a historic civic building at 410 Cushman Street in Fairbanks, Alaska.  It is a two-story Art Deco structure, built out of reinforced concrete in 1935 as a fireproof alternative to the city's previous city hall.  The building is roughly T-shaped, with quoining patterns incised in the corners and bands of decoration on a parapet level.  The building was originally built to house city offices as well as police and fire stations; the entrances to the fire equipment bays on Cushman Street have been filled in with wood framing and siding.  The building was enlarged by extensions to the rear twice, once before 1950, and once after the 1967 floods.  The city moved its offices to the adjacent Main School in 1994; the building then housed the Fairbanks Community Museum until it was acquired by Fairbanks Distilling Company in July 2014.

The building was listed on the National Register of Historic Places in 2002.

See also
National Register of Historic Places listings in Fairbanks North Star Borough, Alaska

References

Art Deco architecture in Alaska
Government buildings completed in 1935
Buildings and structures in Fairbanks, Alaska
City halls in Alaska
City and town halls on the National Register of Historic Places in Alaska
History museums in Alaska
Former seats of local government
Museums in Fairbanks, Alaska
Office buildings in Alaska
Buildings and structures on the National Register of Historic Places in Fairbanks North Star Borough, Alaska